Coleophora buettikeri is a moth of the family Coleophoridae. It is found in Saudi Arabia. It has a wingspan of 15 mm.

References

buettikeri
Moths described in 1990